Monopis meliorella, the blotched monopis moth, is a moth of the family Tineidae. It was first described by Francis Walker in 1863. It has been recorded from Australia (including Norfolk Island) and Hawaii.

The larvae probably feed on animal fibre or refuse of plant origin.

External links

Image

Tineinae
Moths described in 1863